Bayazeed Khan Panni (1925–2012) was a politician, homeopathic medicine practitioner, writer, and social reformer. He was a member of East Pakistan provincial assembly.

Early life 
Panni was born on 11 March 1925, to the Karatia Zamindari family based in Tangail. He is the son of Mohammad Mehedi Ali Khan Panni and the grandson of Mohammed Haider Ali Khan Panni. His grandfather, the Jamindar of Dhanbari Syed Nawab Ali Chowdhury, was one of the founders of Dhaka University. He was imprisoned for an anti-British campaign.

His uncle, Nawabzada Mohammad Ali Chowdhury (Bogra), was the Prime Minister of Pakistan (1953–1955) and his cousin, Mohammad Khurram Khan Panni (KK Panni), was a member of the Legislative Assembly. He later served as the Ambassador of Bangladesh to the Philippines.

Education 
Panni started his education at Rokayaya High Madrasah where he studied for two years. Having passed the matriculation examination from the Hafez Mahmud Ali Institution in 1942 (presently known as SSC), he was admitted in the Azizul Huq College at Bogra. After studying there for a year, he transferred to Islamia College (now Moulana Abul Kalam Azad College) in Kolkata, where he completed his secondary education.

During his studies at Islamia College in Kolkata, he joined the Anti-British Movement. He gained the fellowship of Mahatma Gandhi, Quaid-e-Azam Mohammad Ali Jinnah, Aurobindo Ghosh, Huseyn Shaheed Suhrawardy and Maulana Syed Abul Ala Maududi. During this time, he joined Allama Inayatullah Khan al-Mashriqi the Khaksar Movement. In the student position, he was nominated as East Bengal commander and 'Salar-e-Khas Hind' in this movement.

Career 
After the partition of the country, he returned to his village and started various business ventures.  In the 1950s, he was attracted to homeopathy therapy and started practicing it in his village after obtaining a degree from Tangail Homeo Medical College in 1957.
In 1963, he stood for Parliament by-election from Tangail-Bashail constituency vacated by his cousin Khurram Khan Panni who was appointed as ambassador of Pakistan. He got elected as an independent candidate for the East Pakistan Provincial Assembly. During his tenure, he became a member of the Commonwealth Parliamentary Association.

Organizational activities 
In 1995, he started a Movement for calling people to the real Islam, which he named Hezbut Tawheed (Party of Tawheed).

Death 
Panni died on 16 January 2012.

Literary works 
Bagh-ban-Banduk was a work inspired by his experiences hunting in various forests around the country. The book was included in the syllabus of Class XII as rapid reading by the Education Board on the recommendation of Shaheed Munir Chowdhury who was the editor of the East wing of the Pakistan Writer's Guild. He also wrote articles in different newspapers on religion, politics and medicine.

Other books written by him 

 Islam er Prokrito Ruprekha (The Outline of the True Islam)
 The Lost Islam (English language) 
 Jehad, Ketal, Shontrash (Struggle, Armed Fight & Terrorism)
 E Islam Islam-e Noy (This Islam is not Islam at all)

References 

1925 births
2012 deaths
Bangladeshi physicians
Bangladeshi politicians
Bangladeshi homeopaths
Karatia Zamindari family
20th-century Bengalis
21st-century Bengalis